Longfeng District is a district of the city of Daqing, Heilongjiang Province, in the northeastern People's Republic of China.

Administrative divisions 
Longfeng District is divided into 7 subdistricts and 1 town. 
7 subdistricts
 Longfeng, Xinghua, Wolitun, Dongguang, Sanyong, Longzheng, Shidi
1 town
 Longfeng

References

External links
 Official site 

Longfeng
Daqing